Rolland Harve Golden (November 8, 1931 – July 1, 2019) was an American visual artist known mainly for his realism, abstract realism and "Borderline-Surrealisterm", a term he used to describe a style of his where the subject is "not entirely impossible, but highly unlikely." He is listed in Marquis Who's Who in America, Marquis Who's Who in American Art and Marquis Who's Who in the World.

Golden studied under regionalist painter and teacher John McCrady in the French Quarter of New Orleans after finishing a 4-year stint in the United States Navy during the Korean War, graduating in 1957. 

Golden had a solo exhibition tour the former Soviet Union from 1976 to 1977, touring Moscow, Kiev, Leningrad, and Odessa.

Childhood
Golden was born in New Orleans, Louisiana, but at the age of 2 he and his parents moved to Grenada, MS, then 4 years later Jackson, MS, where they lived 4 years before moving to Montgomery, Alabama for 1 year and then Birmingham, Alabama for 1 year before returning to New Orleans. His father was a manager for AT&T and his position moved his family around. Golden was a very sickly child and spent much of his time in bed - he was not expected to live past his teenage years because he was asthmatic and anemic. Fortunately, he did improve and even went on to play football in High School and for 1 semester at Southwestern Louisiana Institute in Lafayette, Louisiana - now the University of Louisiana at Lafayette. Golden said that his love for the Mississippi Delta was formed in his childhood, while living in these rural areas, notably Grenada, MS. "I didn't realize it at the time," Rolland told 'Southwest Art Magazine' in 1978, "but the beauty of the rural South was making quite an impact on my young mind."

Early adulthood
Golden left college after only one semester to join the United States Navy, before being drafted, to fight the Korean War. He spent four years, mainly on aircraft carriers, in teletype positions. After being stationed on Guam for 20 months, he served on the USS Yorktown, USS Wasp, USS Oriskany, and USS Lexington. Upon discharge, he enrolled in the John McCrady Art School in the French Quarter of New Orleans and studied under the well-known southern artist, John McCrady.  Golden studied for 2 years and graduated in 1957.June 1957, he opened his first studio/gallery at 624 Royal Street in the French Quarter. The studio was called Patio Art Studio and was located through a carriageway and patio and in the back, slave quarter  section of the building. Golden would remain in this location for 10 years.  Golden married Stella Anne Doussan August, 1957. They mainly lived in the French Quarter between 1957 - 1981 while raising 3 children: Carrie (1958), Mark Damian (1961) and Lucille (1963).

Museum exhibitions

"River & Reverie: Paintings of the Mississippi";, Mississippi Museum of Art, Jackson, Mississippi September 2010 - January 2011;Alexandria Museum of Art, Alexandria, Louisiana 2011; Masur Museum of Art, Monroe, Louisiana, 2011; Louisiana Old State Capitol, Baton Rouge, Louisiana December 7, 2011 - March 10, 2012;Walter Anderson Museum of Art, Ocean Springs, Mississippi, 2012;The University of Mississippi Museum of Art, Oxford, Mississippi, 2012

"Katrina: Days of Terror, Months of Anguish" - November 2007-February 2008 at the New Orleans Museum of Art and February–March 2009 at the Museum of Art, Springfield, MO.

Awards
Louisiana Legends 2015 Award Honoree - Awarded by the Louisiana Public Broadcasting 
Among numerous awards, Golden was a two-time recipient of the Thomas Hart Benton Purchase Award, a three-time recipient of the National Arts Club First Place Award, and a winner of the Winslow Homer Memorial Award.

Publications

Books

Magazines and newspapers

Memberships
Golden was a member of such art leagues as the Watercolor USA Honor Society (past Vice-President), The National Arts Club, National Watercolor Society, California, and Allied Artists of America, New York.

References

External links
 
 Noma.org
 Msmuseumart.org
 Pelicanpub.com
 Blog.nola.com
 News-leader.com
 Thanks-katrina.blogspot.com
 Hnoc.org
 Watercolorusa.org
 
 

1931 births
2019 deaths
Artists from New Orleans
Writers from New Orleans
Military personnel from Louisiana
20th-century American painters
American male painters
21st-century American painters
Southern art
20th-century American male artists